Martin Jack (born 24 April 1989) is a Scottish footballer who played as a forward for Stranraer.

Playing career
Jack was part of the youth teams at Elgin and Inverness Caledonian Thistle.  He had a loan spell at Camelon in 2008-2009 but didn't make a first team appearance for either Highland side.

He then signed for Stenhousemuir but was released in 2009 after a short spell at the Warriors.

The striker signed for Stranraer shortly after his release from Ochilview Park. He made 16 appearances for The Blues and scored his only senior goal on 25 July 2009 in a 4–2 win over Berwick Rangers.

Jack was signed for Bathgate Thistle on loan in 2010 by then manager Graeme Love.

Following his permanent departure from Stair Park, Jack had spells at Livingston United and Stoneyburn before returning to Bathgate Thistle.  It proved to be a successful second spell at Thistle as he scooped the club's top goalscorer award in 2014–2015.

References

External links
Martin Jack on Soccerbase

1989 births
Living people
Scottish footballers
Scottish Football League players
Association football midfielders
Elgin City F.C. players
Inverness Caledonian Thistle F.C. players
Camelon Juniors F.C. players
Stranraer F.C. players
Bathgate Thistle F.C. players
Livingston United F.C. players
Stoneyburn F.C. players
Stenhousemuir F.C. players
Sportspeople from Broxburn, West Lothian